Samsung WatchON, first introduced on Galaxy S4 devices, was a service that allowed users to view programming information on their TV or set-top box, and choose programs directly from their mobile devices. Samsung WatchON also provides real-time programming and VOD content recommendations based on the user's viewing patterns; it also includes a virtual remote controller which uses the built-in IR Blaster of the device to control televisions, home theater systems, and media players of any brand, provided they are IR compatible. Samsung WatchON is available on the Galaxy S4, Galaxy S4 Mini, Galaxy S5, Galaxy S5 Mini, Galaxy Note 3, Galaxy Note 3 Neo, Galaxy Note 4, Galaxy Note Edge, Galaxy Alpha, Galaxy Note 8.0, Galaxy Note 10.1, Galaxy Note 10.1 2014 Edition, Galaxy Note Pro 12.2, Galaxy Tab 2 7.0, Galaxy Tab 2 10.1, Galaxy Tab 3 7.0, Galaxy Tab 3 8.0, Galaxy Tab 3 10.1, Galaxy Tab 4 7.0, Galaxy Tab 4 8.0, Galaxy Tab 4 10.1, Galaxy Tab Pro 8.4, Galaxy Tab Pro 10.1, Galaxy Tab Pro 12.2, Galaxy Tab S 8.4, Galaxy Tab S 10.5, and Gear 2 devices.

App is discontinued on December 31, 2014 worldwide except US and Korea, and June 15, 2015 in those remaining two countries.

Features

Personalized Recommendation 
Samsung WatchON provides customized content recommendations based on a user's personal viewing history.

One stop Search 
Samsung WatchON provides movies and TV shows in one place.

Universal Remote Control and TV Guide 
Samsung WatchON allows users to control TVs, set-top boxes, and other media devices, from a compatible Samsung Galaxy Phone/Tablet.

Multi Device Experience 
Samsung WatchON allows users to watch digital content on a mobile device and then continue to watch the item on a compatible TV, or vice versa.

External links
 
 

WatchON